Fright to the Finish is a 1954 animated American short film directed by Seymour Kneitel and Al Eugster starring Jack Mercer as Popeye. The short was released by Paramount Pictures on August 27, 1954.

Plot summary
It is Halloween night and Olive is reading ghost stories to Popeye and Bluto. Both of the men want to have alone time with Olive, with Popeye wondering if Bluto hasn't got a home to go to and Bluto wondering what to do to get rid of "that runt" Popeye. Bluto pretends to leave in order to stage various pranks (a headless man, an animated skeleton, and a sheet-over-balloon ghost) to scare Olive and Popeye. He pins the blame on Popeye, who is kicked out of the house by Olive, and Bluto goes to comfort her.

Popeye gets back at Bluto by going into Olive's bedroom through her window (which was still open) and uses a jar of vanishing cream to make himself invisible. He scares both Olive and Bluto (mainly Bluto), and Bluto eventually runs out of Olive's house. Popeye reveals himself and Olive kisses him for saving her, getting red lipstick all over Popeye's face. Popeye turns to the audience and says, "Loves them ghosts."

Cast
The cast consists of:
Jackson Beck as Bluto
Jack Mercer as Popeye
Mae Questel as Olive Oyl

References

External links

1954 animated films
1950s English-language films
American films about Halloween
Popeye the Sailor theatrical cartoons
1950s American animated films
1954 short films
Paramount Pictures short films
1954 comedy films
American comedy short films
American animated short films